Castle Cary railway station is on the Reading to Taunton line  south west of London Paddington and the Bristol to Weymouth line  south of Bristol Temple Meads. The two routes share tracks between Westbury and Castle Cary stations and are both operated by Great Western Railway, which also manages the station.

History

Castle Cary station was originally on the Wilts, Somerset and Weymouth Railway, a railway that linked the Great Western Railway (GWR) at Chippenham with Weymouth. The line was authorised in 1845, was acquired by the GWR in 1850, reached Castle Cary on 1 September 1856, and was completed throughout in 1857.

For the remainder of the 19th century, the GWR's principal route from London Paddington station to Exeter, Plymouth and Penzance was an indirect one via Bristol Temple Meads (the so-called Great Way Round). However, in 1895 the GWR directors announced that new lines were to be constructed to enable trains to reach Exeter, Plymouth and Penzance in a shorter time.

This was followed by the construction of the Langport and Castle Cary Railway, which was opened from Castle Cary to the existing Bristol to Exeter line at Cogload Junction in 1906. This transformed Castle Cary from a station on a secondary north to south line, to one on a main east to west route. The route resulting from these improvements and extensions forms the current London to Penzance line.

The station was awarded the Small Station of the Year award in the National Rail Awards 2007.

Stationmasters

Edwin Wall 1856 - 1860 (afterwards station master at Dorchester)
Peter Leach 1860 - 1862 (formerly station master at Dorchester)
Thomas Curtis from 1862 
Henry R. Fletcher 1869 - 1884
G. Kerrick North 1884 - 1888  (formerly station master at Highworth, afterwards station master at Twyford)
William Wilcox 1888 - 1892 (afterwards station master at Shepton Mallet)
Walter Henry Gale 1892 - 1899
Thomas Jenkins 1899 - 1903 (formerly station master at Witham Friary, afterwards station master at Witham Friary)
William Garard 1903  (formerly station master at Keynsham)
Frederick William Augustus Hallett 1903 - 1910 (afterwards station master at Bewdley)
Thomas Blea from 1912 (formerly station master at Cheddar)
J.W. Bennett from 1916 (formerly station master at Woodborough)
Herbert Samuel Morrall 1919 - ca. 1921 (formerly station master at Somerton)
R. Davis ca. 1922
G.E. Nailor 1927 - 1935 (formerly station master at Bruton, afterwards station master at Chippenham)
Mr. Fawden ca. 1942
V. Hopkins ca. 1956 ca. 1963

Platform layout

The station has three platforms. The main station facilities are located on the London bound platform 1, as well as the main station building and ticket office which is staffed until the afternoon. Toilet facilities are available on the concourse too. In front of the building is a car park for 100 cars, a bus stop and a taxi rank. Platform 2 serves west bound services to Taunton, Exeter, Plymouth and Penzance, whilst the shorter platform 3 can only be used by trains on the Bristol to Weymouth line. Immediately to the west of the station the Weymouth line diverges from the London to Penzance Line.

Location 
Castle Cary station is the closest station to the site of the Glastonbury Festival, which is held near Pilton about 8 miles away. During the period of the festival additional trains are provided, and special buses are run from the station to the festival site.  The station also serves events at the Royal Bath and West Showground, though these are not provided with extra trains.  It is also the nearest main line station to the city of Wells which lost its rail connection in 1963.

Services

The service on the London to Penzance line runs approximately every two hours, with 8 trains in each direction, although not all trains run as far as Penzance. The service on the Bristol to Weymouth line runs on a similar frequency, again with 8 trains in each direction.

References

Railway stations in Somerset
Railway stations in Great Britain opened in 1856
Former Great Western Railway stations
Railway stations served by Great Western Railway
Railway stations served by South Western Railway
DfT Category D stations
Castle Cary